Steven Charles Shields (born July 19, 1972) is a Canadian former professional ice hockey goaltender. During his playing career, which lasted from 1994 to 2006, he played ten seasons in the National Hockey League with the Buffalo Sabres, San Jose Sharks, Mighty Ducks of Anaheim, Boston Bruins, Florida Panthers, and Atlanta Thrashers.

Playing career
Shields grew up in North Bay, Ontario, playing minor hockey until bantam level with the local Athletics AA program of the NOHA. At age 16, Shields moved to southern Ontario to play for the St. Marys Lincolns Jr.B. club of the OHA before accepting a scholarship to the University of Michigan.

As a collegiate player, Shields became the first goalie in NCAA history to record 100 career victories and was a two-time All American.

Shields was drafted in the fifth round (#101 overall) in the 1991 NHL Entry Draft by the Buffalo Sabres out of the University of Michigan. Shields was a journeyman NHL goaltender over his tenure. In his NHL career, Shields would play for the Buffalo Sabres, San Jose Sharks, Mighty Ducks of Anaheim, Boston Bruins, Florida Panthers, and Atlanta Thrashers.

1996 AHL Calder Cup champion
After starting the season with only a .500 record, the Rochester Americans rallied late in the season to go on and win the Calder Cup in game seven defeating the Portland Pirates 2-1. Steve Shields set an American Hockey League record with 15 playoff victories.  John Tortorella was the coach.

1997 playoffs
One of his career highlights was during the 1997 playoffs, when Dominik Hašek was injured. Hašek had been the team MVP and the league's best goalie during the regular season and he had been considered crucial to the Sabres' playoff hopes. With Hašek leaving in the midst of game three of the first round, Shields was forced to step in but he helped the Sabres to rally and defeat the Ottawa Senators.

Shields then played the second round series against the Philadelphia Flyers, as Hašek was suspended for three games after an altercation with reporter Jim Kelley. A line brawl between the two teams broke out in game one that resulted in a memorable goaltender fight between Shields and the Flyers' Garth Snow. Hašek was set to return in game four with the team down by three games in the series, but he told the Sabres' coaching staff he felt a twinge in his knee and left the ice after the pregame skate. Shields turned in another season-saving performance as Buffalo staved off the almost inevitable sweeping elimination with a win. Again before the fifth game, Hašek declared himself unfit to play and Shields would finish the series with Buffalo losing 6–3 and being eliminated.

1999–2000 season
Shields's best season was in the 1999–2000 season, when he played in 67 games for the San Jose Sharks while posting respectable goaltending numbers for the team (27 wins, 30 losses, four shutouts, a 2.56 GAA, and a .911 save percentage). San Jose made it to the second round of the playoffs that year.

Goalie mask design
Shields had a notable goalie mask which was designed while he was a member of the Boston Bruins during the 2002-03 season. Shields's mask was a tribute to former Bruins goalie Gerry Cheevers famed "stitch mask". He continued wearing the stitch mask after he was traded to the Florida Panthers, and being signed by the Atlanta Thrashers.

Coaching career
Shields served under Mel Pearson as a volunteer assistant coach at Michigan Tech for two seasons from 2011 to 2013 before joining the Florida Panthers as a goaltending consultant in the summer of 2013.

On May 7, 2015, it was announced that Shields was named a volunteer assistant coach for the Michigan Wolverines men's ice hockey team.

Career statistics

Awards and honours

References

External links
 

1972 births
Living people
Atlanta Thrashers players
Boston Bruins players
Buffalo Sabres draft picks
Buffalo Sabres players
Canadian ice hockey goaltenders
Chicago Wolves players
Florida Panthers coaches
Florida Panthers players
Houston Aeros (1994–2013) players
Michigan Wolverines men's ice hockey players
Mighty Ducks of Anaheim players
Rochester Americans players
San Jose Sharks players
South Carolina Stingrays players
Ice hockey people from Toronto
Canadian ice hockey coaches
AHCA Division I men's ice hockey All-Americans